Echinosepala balaeniceps is a species of orchid plant native to Panama.

References 

balaeniceps
Flora of Panama
Plants described in 1986